Phaiogramma stibolepida is a species of moth of the family Geometridae erected by Arthur Gardiner Butler in 1879. It is found in eastern and southern Africa and on Madagascar.

The larvae feed on Malvaceae species and their wingspan is around 20 mm.

The original description of Butler of this species is:

References

Geometrinae
Moths described in 1879
Moths of Madagascar
Fauna of Somalia
Moths of Africa
Taxa named by Arthur Gardiner Butler